Phalaris minor is a species of grass native to North Africa, Europe, and South Asia.  The bunchgrass is widely naturalised elsewhere.

Common names include little seed canary grass, small-seeded canary grass, small canary grass, lesser-canary grass, guli danda (Hindi), and sittee booti (Urdu).

Description
It has a spike-like panicle.

Taxonomy
It has had an uneventful taxonomic history. It was first published under its current name by Anders Jahan Retzius in 1783, and has retained that name since. It has no synonyms, and no infraspecific taxa.

Uses
It is used as a fodder or forage for livestock and birdseed, but is poisonous to some mammals, and is a potential contaminant of seed crops.

References

minor
Bunchgrasses of Africa
Bunchgrasses of Asia
Bunchgrasses of Europe
Flora of France
Grasses of Pakistan
Flora of Western Asia
Flora of North Africa
Flora of Algeria
Flora of Cyprus
Flora of Egypt
Flora of Eritrea
Flora of Italy
Flora of Morocco
Flora of Afghanistan
Flora of Iran
Flora of Iraq
Flora of Israel
Flora of Syria
Flora of Portugal
Flora of Palestine (region)
Flora of Spain
Taxa named by Anders Jahan Retzius
Plants described in 1783
Flora of Malta